Peter Ffrench Loughlin (12 December 1881 – 11 July 1960) was an Australian politician.

Early life
He was born in Braidwood to police constable John Loughlin and Sarah Jane, née Ffrench. He was educated at Girrinderra and Goulburn, becoming a schoolteacher and teaching at various public schools from 1900 to 1917. He married Louisa Davis at Cowra on 16 April 1906, with whom he had seven children.

Parliamentary career
A member of the Labor Party, he was elected to the New South Wales Legislative Assembly in 1917 as the member for Burrangong, moving to Cootamundra with the introduction of proportional representation in 1920. He was Secretary for Lands and Minister for Forests from 1920 to 1922 and from 1925 to 1926, and deputy leader of the Labor Party from 1923 to 1926 (and deputy premier from 1925–26), when he resigned from the party. He ran as an independent candidate for Young at the 1930 election, during which time he was working as a proofreader for the Goulburn Evening Post, and at the 1932 election he ran for Goulburn as a United Australia Party candidate, winning election. He was defeated in 1935.

Subsequent life and death
After his defeat Loughlin farmed in the Carcoar and Mandurama districts before retiring to Pennant Hills in the 1950s.

References

 

1881 births
1960 deaths
Independent members of the Parliament of New South Wales
United Australia Party members of the Parliament of New South Wales
Members of the New South Wales Legislative Assembly
Australian educators
Australian Labor Party members of the Parliament of New South Wales
20th-century Australian politicians